Caithness was a county constituency of the House of Commons of the Parliament of Great Britain from 1708 to 1801 and of the Parliament of the United Kingdom from 1801 to 1918.

Creation
The British parliamentary constituency was created in 1708 following the Acts of Union, 1707 and replaced the former Parliament of Scotland shire constituency of Caithness-shire.

History
From 1708 to 1832 Caithness and Buteshire were paired as alternating constituencies: one of the constituencies elected a Member of Parliament (MP) to one parliament, the other to the next. The areas which were covered by the two constituencies are quite remote from each other, Caithness in the northeast of Scotland and Buteshire in the southwest.
From 1832 to 1918 Caithness was represented continuously by its own MP.

The constituency elected one Member of Parliament by the first past the post system until the seat was abolished in 1918.

Boundaries
From 1708 to 1832, the Caithness constituency covered the county of Caithness minus the parliamentary burgh of Wick, which was a component of the Tain Burghs constituency. In 1832, Wick retained its status as a parliamentary burgh and became a component of the Wick Burghs constituency.

By 1892, Caithness had become a local government county and, throughout Scotland, under the Local Government (Scotland) Act 1889, county boundaries had been redefined for all purposes except parliamentary representation. 26 years were to elapse before constituency boundaries were redrawn, by the Representation of the People Act 1918, to take account of new local government boundaries.

In 1918, the Caithness and Sutherland county constituency was created. The Caithness and Sutherland constituency was created to cover the county of Caithness and the county of Sutherland. The Wick Burghs constituency was abolished and two of its former components, Wick and Dornoch, were merged into the new Caithness and Sutherland constituency.

Members of Parliament

MPs 1708 to 1832

MPs 1832 to 1918

Elections

Elections in the 1840s
As the alternating pair  returned the MP for the 1830 general election. The 1831 result is compared to the 1830 result at Buteshire.

Elections in the 1840s

Elections in the 1850s

Elections in the 1860s

Traill resigned, causing a by-election.

Elections in the 1870s

Elections in the 1880s

Elections in the 1890s

Elections in the 1900s

Elections in the 1910s 

General Election 1914–15:

Another General Election was required to take place before the end of 1915. The political parties had been making preparations for an election to take place and by July 1914, the following candidates had been selected; 
Liberal: Leicester Harmsworth
Unionist:

References

Sources 

Historic parliamentary constituencies in Scotland (Westminster)
Constituencies of the Parliament of the United Kingdom established in 1708
Constituencies of the Parliament of the United Kingdom disestablished in 1918
Politics of the county of Caithness